Jack Broadbent (born 1 November 2000) is an English professional rugby league footballer who plays as a er or  for the Castleford Tigers in the Betfred Super League.

He previously played for the Leeds Rhinos in the Super League, and spent time on loan from Leeds at Featherstone Rovers and the Batley Bulldogs in the Betfred Championship.

Background
Broadbent attended Bruntcliffe Academy in Morley, West Yorkshire.

Broadbent played his amateur rugby league with Dewsbury Moor and Batley Boys.

Career

Leeds Rhinos
Broadbent made his Super League debut in round 14 of the 2020 Super League season for Leeds against the Catalans Dragons.

In round 11 of the 2021 Super League season, he scored two tries for Leeds in a 38–12 victory over Salford. The following week, he scored four tries in a 48–18 victory over Leigh.

Castleford Tigers 
On 2 December 2022, Castleford Tigers announced the signing of Broadbent on a two-year deal.

References

External links
Leeds Rhinos profile

2001 births
Living people
Batley Bulldogs players
Castleford Tigers players
England Knights national rugby league team players
English rugby league players
Featherstone Rovers players
Leeds Rhinos players
Rugby league second-rows
Rugby league five-eighths
Rugby league players from Batley